Troy Anthony Carter (born October 26, 1963) is an American politician serving as the U.S. representative for Louisiana's 2nd congressional district since 2021. He was previously a member of the Louisiana State Senate for the 7th district. A member of the Democratic Party, Carter also previously served on the New Orleans City Council and as a member of the Louisiana House of Representatives.

Early life and education 
Carter was born in New Orleans. After graduating from Oliver Perry Walker High School in Algiers, he attended Xavier University of Louisiana, where he earned a Bachelor of Arts degree in business administration and political science. He has completed programs at the Harvard Kennedy School and Carnegie Mellon University's School of Urban and Public Affairs.

Early career 

Carter has been an adjunct political science instructor at Xavier University of Louisiana. Before his election to the state legislature, he served six years as executive assistant to New Orleans mayor Sidney Barthelemy.

Carter was elected as a member of the Louisiana House of Representatives in 1991, becoming the first African-American to serve District 102 in the Louisiana House. As a state representative in 1993, he introduced legislation to prohibit discrimination against LGBTQ individuals. After his election to the Louisiana Senate, he filed similar legislation in 2017 and 2020.

In 1994, he was elected to represent District C on the New Orleans City Council. He served until 2002, when he unsuccessfully ran for mayor, losing the primary election to Ray Nagin and Richard Pennington. He was an unsuccessful candidate for Louisiana's 2nd congressional district seat in 2006 against then-incumbent William J. Jefferson.

After several years out of public office, Carter was elected to the Louisiana Senate in 2015. He received 12,935 votes (56.8%) in the 2015 runoff election to Jeff Arnold's 9,852 (43.2%). Carter authored or co-sponsored 75 bills that went on to become law. While also serving as chair of the Louisiana Senate Democratic Caucus, Carter chairs the Senate's Labor and Industrial Relations Committee.

Carter also chairs the Algiers Development District.

U.S. House of Representatives

Elections

2021 Special 

On November 18, 2020, U.S. Representative Cedric Richmond announced that he would resign from Louisiana's 2nd congressional district in January 2021 after having been selected by President-elect Joe Biden to be Senior Advisor to the President and the administration's director of the Office of Public Liaison. Carter then ran to fill the seat in Congress in the special election. On March 20, 2021, Carter finished first in the top-two primary and advanced, with runner-up Senator Karen Carter Peterson, to the runoff election held on April 24.

Carter was endorsed by Cedric Richmond, John Breaux, 8 congressional Democrats, Helena Moreno, Cleo Fields, Sharon Weston Broome, the AFL–CIO, the Louisiana Democratic Party, The Times-Picayune/The New Orleans Advocate, The Louisiana Weekly, and Gambit.

In the runoff, Carter received 48,511 votes (55.2%) to Peterson's 39,295 (44.8%).

Tenure 
He was sworn in as the U.S. Representative for Louisiana's 2nd congressional district on May 11, 2021, increasing the Democratic Party's majority to 219-212 over the Republican Party in the United States House of Representatives. On August 12, 2022, he voted to pass the Inflation Reduction Act of 2022.

Committee assignments
 Committee on Transportation and Infrastructure
 Committee on Small Business

Caucus memberships 

 New Democrat Coalition
 Congressional Progressive Caucus

Political positions 

Carter opposes conservative measures that have sought to restrict abortion and expand gun rights. During his term of office as a state senator, he had two priorities: raising the state's minimum wage and strengthening anti-discrimination laws against the LGBTQ+ community. He supports the infrastructure policy of the Biden administration.

Personal life
Carter's wife Andreé serves in the United States Army Reserve, and achieved the rank of brigadier general. They have two sons. The family lives on the Westbank of New Orleans, where Carter was born and raised.

See also
List of African-American United States representatives

References

External links

 Representative Troy Carter official U.S. House website
 Troy Carter for Congress campaign website

|-

|-

|-

|-

|-

1963 births
21st-century American politicians
African-American state legislators in Louisiana
African-American people in Louisiana politics
Democratic Party members of the United States House of Representatives from Louisiana
Living people
Democratic Party Louisiana state senators
Democratic Party members of the Louisiana House of Representatives
New Orleans City Council members
Xavier University of Louisiana alumni
21st-century African-American politicians
20th-century African-American people